The 1966 Texas A&M Aggies football team represented Texas A&M University in the 1966 NCAA University Division football season as a member of the Southwest Conference (SWC). The Aggies were led by head coach Gene Stallings in his second season and finished with a record of four wins, five losses and one tie (4–5–1 overall, 4–3 in the SWC).

Schedule

Roster
QB Edd Hargett, So.

References

Texas AandM
Texas A&M Aggies football seasons
Texas AandM Aggies football